is a former Japanese football player.

Playing career
Nakaharai was born in Shizuoka Prefecture on May 22, 1977. After graduating from Shimizu Higashi High School, he joined newly was promoted to J1 League club, Avispa Fukuoka in 1996. He became a regular player in 1997 and played many matches for a long time. However the club results were bad every season and was relegated to J2 League from 2002. In 2001, he moved to Kyoto Purple Sanga (later Kyoto Sanga FC). He played as regular player from first season and the club won the champions 2002 Emperor's Cup. However the club results were bad after that, he also played in J2. Although he served as captain in 2005 and 2006, his opportunity to play decreased in 2007. In 2008, he moved to Avispa Fukuoka for the first time in 7 years. He retired end of 2009 season.

Club statistics

References

External links

1977 births
Living people
Association football people from Shizuoka Prefecture
Japanese footballers
J1 League players
J2 League players
Avispa Fukuoka players
Kyoto Sanga FC players
Association football midfielders